Aunou-sur-Orne (literally Aunou on Orne) is a commune in the Orne department in northwestern France.

History
In 1811 Aunou-sur-Orne absorbed the neighbouring commune of Saint-Cenery-près-Séez (sometimes spelled Saint-Cénery-près-Sées or Saint-Céneri-près-Sées).

Population

Personalities
Nicolas-Jacques Conté (4 August 1755 – 6 December 1805) was a French painter, balloonist, army officer, and inventor of the modern pencil. He was born at Saint-Céneri-près-Sées.

See also
Communes of the Orne department

References

Communes of Orne